James Oyedeji (June 1953 – 4 May 2016), nicknamed Uncle Bode or Uncle Bodey, was a Ghanaian sports historian, who was also the Chief Executive of the Tudu Mighty Jets.

Biography
Oyedeji held a MSc economics degree. He was primarily known as a sports historian, being nicknamed "Uncle Bode" or "Uncle Bodey" due to his extensive knowledge of West African sport, in particular football and boxing. He also worked as the Chief Executive of the Tudu Mighty Jets and Okwawu United.

Death
Oyedeji died aged 63 on 4 June 2016 at 37 Military Hospital in Accra after suffering a stroke; he had previously been admitted to the hospital in 2015 with a heart problem. His death was marked with a one-week celebration.

References

Chief executives in the sports industry
1982 births
2016 deaths
20th-century Ghanaian historians
Sports historians
Ghanaian businesspeople
Ghanaian football chairmen and investors
21st-century Ghanaian historians